The Patriotic Guards were Romanian paramilitary formations formed during the Communist era, designed to provide additional defence in case of a foreign attack.

History

The Patriotic Guards were formed in 1968, after the 21 August Bucharest speech through which Romanian Communist Party General Secretary and State Council President Nicolae Ceaușescu condemned the suppression of the Prague Spring by Soviet and Warsaw Pact forces. Ceaușescu appealed to anti-Sovietism within the general population to ask for resistance against the perceived threat of a similar Soviet invasion against Romania itself. The nationalist themes he used had their immediate effect in rallying large portions of the public, who began organizing and arming themselves under the direction of the Romanian Communist Party (PCR).

Although the threat was over by the end of the year, the Patriotic Guards remained a feature of the republic's communist structure. They became a permanent addition to the regular military, and compulsory training was introduced for young men and women. For university students, this meant that hours of the curriculum were reserved for shooting drills and other training courses; soon, they were doubled by additional requirements for work in the fields (that was also asked from high school and middle school students, as well as their teachers).

No longer backed by enthusiasm as they had been in the early 1970s, the Patriotic Guards nonetheless were the basic line of defence against projected invasions. The threat posed by the latter seemed to increase as the regime plunged into isolation, especially after it lost the support of the Western Bloc in the mid-1980s. From that point on, the Patriotic Guards were to become part of the State's apparatus of repression against its own people.

During the Romanian Revolution of December 1989, Ceaușescu attempted to use them against protesters, notably in Timișoara. However, the pace of events and the breadth of hostility to his regime outstripped this plan. As the Revolution progressed, many Patriotic Guard members (who like most other Romanians were fed up with Ceauşescu's failed economic policies and suffering from declining living standards) actually joined the protesters. To no small extent, the people who were meant to be armed in case of the disturbances were in fact the ones causing them.

Function
The Patriotic Guards was an all-inclusive public security organization, its functions included normal civil policing and fire-fighting, and a very large "People's Militia" force. During wartime it would provide rear area security, augment the ground forces, and operate as guerrillas if their areas were overrun by invaders.

Place in the official ideology

In the 1980s, Romanian communism took on a militarized form. Ilie Ceaușescu, general in the Romanian People's Army and brother of Nicolae, summarized the new traits in his Istoria militară a poporului român ("The Military History of the Romanian People"). The work (soon turned into official dogma) argued that the Romanians had always had the largest standing army in the world—notably, he consistently chose to add up the entire population as present under arms. This constituted a message for the future, since the regime had established a strong connection with all past forms. As such, the ideology behind the formation of the Patriotic Guards was rendered as the War of the Entire People military doctrine, inspired by the Yugoslav Total People's Defense doctrine.

Organization

The Patriotic Guards were staffed by about 700,000 citizens in 1989, both men and women. In keeping with the doctrine of "War of the Entire People", the Patriotic Guards were a combined territorial defence or national guard and civil defence organization, which was established immediately after the Soviet-led Warsaw Pact invasion of Czechoslovakia. The Patriotic Guards worked closely with the Ministry of National Defence but were directly subordinated to the PCR and its youth organization. Relying more on ordinary citizens than on the professional military, the Patriotic Guards served as a potential counterweight to or check on the power and influence of the regular armed forces.

In 1989 the Patriotic Guards were organized into company- and platoon-sized units in almost every județ, municipality, town, village, and industrial or agricultural enterprise. Under the command of the first secretary of the local PCR apparatus, they conducted basic and refresher training in small-arms handling, demolition, mortar and grenade-launcher firing, and small-unit tactics. In wartime they had responsibility for local antiaircraft defence, providing early warning of air attack, defending population centers and important elements of national infrastructure, and conducting civil engineering work as needed to reestablish essential military production after an attack. They would reconnoiter and attack enemy flanks and rear areas, combat airborne units and special forces penetrating deep into Romania, and mount resistance operations against occupying forces. In keeping with their guerrilla image, the Patriotic Guards wore plain uniforms with no insignia or badges of rank.

See also
Similar formations:
Combat Groups of the Working Class
ORMO
People's Militias (Czechoslovakia)
State defense force
Worker-Peasant Red Guards
Workers' Militia
Munkásőrség (Hungary)

References

Lucian Boia, Istorie şi mit în conştiinţa românească ("History and myth in the Romanian conscience"), Bucharest, Humanitas, 1997.
Mihai Retegan, 1968 - Din primăvară până în toamnă ("1968 - From spring to autumn"), Bucharest, RAO, 1998.

External links
Military structure and armament of the Patriotic Guards
Dieter Schlesak interviewed: in the opening paragraphs, he describes his enthusiastic joining of the Guards to fight "against the Russians" (in Romanian)

Government paramilitary forces
Paramilitary organizations based in Romania
Military units and formations established in 1968
Military units and formations disestablished in 1989
Military units and formations of the Cold War
Military of Romania
Military wings of communist parties
Romanian Communist Party
Romanian Revolution
Socialist Republic of Romania